The 2017–18 Florida A&M Rattlers men's basketball team represented Florida A&M University during the 2017–18 NCAA Division I men's basketball season. The Rattlers, led by first-year head coach Robert McCullum, played their home games at the Teaching Gym in Tallahassee, Florida as members of the Mid-Eastern Athletic Conference. They finished the season 9–25, 7–9 in MEAC play to finish in a tie three-way tie for seventh place. As the No. 9 seed in the MEAC tournament, they defeated Howard before losing to Hampton in the quarterfinals,

Previous season
The Rattlers finished the 2016–17 season 7–23, 5–11 in MEAC play to finish in a tie for 11th place. They lost in the first round of the MEAC tournament to South Carolina State.

On March 17, 2017, it was announced that head coach Byron Samuels' contract would not be renewed. He finished at Florida A&M with a three-year record of 17–71. On May 16, the school named Oregon assistant Robert McCullum as their new head coach. McCullum had previous head coaching jobs at Western Michigan and South Florida.

Roster

Schedule and results

|-
!colspan=9 style=| Exhibition

|-
!colspan=9 style=| Non-conference regular season

|-
!colspan=9 style=| MEAC regular season

|-
!colspan=9 style=| MEAC tournament

References

Florida A&M Rattlers basketball seasons
Florida AandM Rattlers